

Squad information

Squad

Player statistics
Appearances for competitive matches only

|}

Topscorers

Total

Allsvenskan

Svenska Cupen

Champions League

Competitions

Overall

Allsvenskan

League table

Matches

Svenska Cupen

Champions League

2nd qualifying round

Friendlies

Notes

References

Djurgarden
Djurgårdens IF Fotboll seasons
Swedish football championship-winning seasons